Liz Gateley is an American television producer. She currently serves as head of programming at Lifetime Television. She is also a founding partner and co-owner, along with Tony DiSanto, of DiGa, a studio and production company hybrid. In what Gateley describes as her "dream job", she is responsible for leading the development of new weekly and daily series for the channel including both scripted and reality projects.

Gateley is known for creating the hit reality series Laguna Beach, inspired by her childhood growing up in Palos Verdes, California. It was the first thing she pitched at MTV back in 2003, the summer in which she started, and she went on to serve as executive producer of that series. Her next creation was 8th & Ocean, which also went on to become a hit series for MTV. Since then, she has developed a diverse slate of hits series for the network, which most recently included Teen Mom and 16 and Pregnant, on which she also served as executive producer. Gateley has successfully expanded MTV programming to include hit shows such as The Hills, Randy Jackson Presents America's Next Best Dance Crew, The Buried Life, Rob Dyrdek's Fantasy Factory, Nitro Circus, The City, Human Giant and Run's House as well as the 2009 documentary, Britney: For the Record. She is also an executive producer for the former MTV and now, VH1 series Scream. In 2019, Gateley was appointed as Spotify's head of creative development in podcasts.

Projects in development under Gateley's guidance include the series Teen Wolf, a thriller reinvention of the 1985 blockbuster film, and the critically acclaimed British hit series, Skins. Recent projects include two scripted comedy series, The Hard Times of RJ Berger and Warren the Ape, which aired in June 2010.

Prior to MTV and her current position at Lifetime, Gateley worked at Lifetime Television where she was responsible for the development of primetime and daytime scripted and reality original series and specials, including Strong Medicine, The Division, Intimate Portrait, and Weddings of a Lifetime. She now works as head of all programming. Before Lifetime, Gateley got her first shot in the entertainment industry while working at William Morris Agency in their agent trainee program. She is also an attorney who practiced corporate law.

Gateley graduated from Loyola Law School with a J.D. degree after earning a B. A. in Economics/Business from University of California, Los Angeles.

Other works
Scream (2015–2019) – executive producer
Kesha: My Crazy Beautiful Life (2013) – executive producer
The Hard Times of RJ Berger (2010) – executive producer
Warren the Ape (2010) – executive producer
Teen Mom (2009–2010) – executive producer
The City (2008–2010) – executive producer
Taking the Stage (2009–2010) – executive producer
The Hills (2006–2010) – executive producer
Paris Hilton's My New BFF (2008–2009) – executive producer
Scarred (2007) – executive producer
Maui Fever (2007) – executive producer
Newport Harbor: The Real Orange County (2007) – executive producer
Human Giant (2007) – executive producer
8th & Ocean (2006) – executive producer
The Shop (2006) – executive producer
Run's House (2005) – executive producer
Stankervision (2005) – executive producer
PoweR Girls (2005) – executive producer
Laguna Beach: The Real Orange County (2004) – executive producer

References

External links

Television producers from California
American women television producers
Living people
The Hills (TV series)
People from Palos Verdes, California
Year of birth missing (living people)
21st-century American women